Thomas Cramen (born 1848, date of death unknown) was a United States Navy sailor and a recipient of the United States military's highest decoration, the Medal of Honor.

Biography
Born in 1848 in Ireland, Cremen immigrated to the United States and joined the Navy from Massachusetts. By February 7, 1882, he was serving as a boatswain's mate on the training ship . On that day, while Portsmouth was at the Washington Navy Yard, he and another sailor, Seaman Henry C. Courtney, jumped overboard and rescued Jack-of-the-Dust Charles Taliaferro from drowning. For this action, both Cremen and Courtney were awarded the Medal of Honor two and a half years later, on October 18, 1884.

Cremen's official Medal of Honor citation reads:
On board the U.S.S. Portsmouth, Washington Navy Yard, 7 February 1882. Jumping overboard from that vessel, Cramen rescued Charles Taliaferro, jack-of-the-dust, from drowning.

See also

List of Medal of Honor recipients during peacetime

References

External links

1848 births
Year of death missing
Irish emigrants to the United States (before 1923)
United States Navy sailors
United States Navy Medal of Honor recipients
Irish-born Medal of Honor recipients
Irish sailors in the United States Navy
Non-combat recipients of the Medal of Honor